The córdoba (sign: C$; code: NIO) is the currency of Nicaragua. It is divided into 100 centavos.

History 
The first córdoba was introduced with the new National Bank of Nicaragua (Banco Nacional de Nicaragua Incorporado) which was created in 1912 , after which the government of Adolfo Díaz promulgated the Monetary Conversion Law, in March 1912. This law created the monetary unit Córdoba, but due to the prevailing political instability at that time, the Córdoba did not circulate until mid-1913.

It replaced the peso moneda corriente at a rate of  pesos m/c = 1 córdoba and the peso fuerte at par. It was initially nearly equal to the US dollar. It was named after the Conquistador Francisco Hernández de Córdoba.

In 1960 the Central Bank of Nicaragua (BCN) was founded and the banknotes and coins that until that date were issued by the National Bank of Nicaragua, began to be issued by the central bank.

On February 15, 1988, the 2nd córdoba was introduced. It was equal to 1,000 1st córdobas. 

On April 30, 1991, the third córdoba, also called the córdoba oro, was introduced, worth 5,000,000 2nd córdobas.

Coins

First córdoba 
The  and 1 centavo were minted in bronze, the 5 centavos in cupro-nickel and the higher denominations in silver. The 1 córdoba was only minted in 1912, whilst  centavo production ceased in 1937.

In 1939, cupro-nickel replaced silver on the 10, 25 and 50 centavos. In 1943, a single year issue of brass 1, 5, 10 & 25 centavos was made. These were the last 1 centavo coins. In 1972, cupro-nickel 1 córdoba coins were issued, followed, in 1974, by aluminium 5 and 10 centavos.

A new series of coins, featuring a portrait of Augusto César Sandino, was introduced in 1981, consisting of aluminum 5 and 10 centavos, nickel-clad steel 25 centavos and cupro-nickel 50 centavos, 1 and 5 córdobas. Nickel clad steel replaced cupro nickel between 1983 and 1984. In 1987, the final coins of the 1st córdoba were issued, featuring Sandino's characteristic hat. Aluminum 500 córdobas were issued.

25, 50 centavos and 1 córdoba coins minted in 1985 were mostly recalled and destroyed by the Central Bank. A few of the 1 córdoba were circulated as seen.

Second córdoba 

No coins were issued for this currency.

Third córdoba (córdoba oro) 

In 1991, coins dated 1987 but actually introduced with that year's re-denomination, in denominations of 5, 10 and 25 centavos and aluminum-bronze 50 centavos, 1 and 5 córdobas were issued.

In 1994, coins were issued in denominations of 5, 10, 25 and 50 centavos. All were minted in chrome-plated steel. In 1997, nickel-clad steel 50 centavos, 1 and 5 córdobas were introduced, followed by copper-plated steel 5 centavos and brass-plated steel 10 and 25 centavos in 2002 and brass-plated steel 10 córdobas in 2007.

All current coins have the coat of arms of the country on the obverse and the numeral of the denomination on the reverse.

Banknotes

First córdoba 
In 1912, the National Bank of Nicaragua introduced notes for 10, 25 and 50 centavos, 1, 2, 5, 10, 20, 50 and 100 córdobas, together with old half- and 1-peso moneda corriente notes overprinted for 4 and 8 centavos of the new currency. In 1934, all circulating banknotes were exchanged for notes which had been overprinted with "REVALIDO" ("revalidated"). The last notes for less than 1 córdoba were dated 1938. In 1945, 500-córdoba notes were introduced, followed by 1,000-córdoba notes in 1953.

In 1962, the Central Bank of Nicaragua took over paper money issuance by a bank resolution of 8 February 1962 and executive decree No. 71 of 26 April 1962. The 1-córdoba notes were replaced by coins in 1972. After 5-córdoba coins were introduced in 1981, 2  and 5-córdoba notes were withdrawn. In 1987, 5000-córdoba notes were introduced, followed by overprinted 10,000 (on 10), 20,000 (on 20), 50,000 (on 50), 100,000 (on 100), 100,000 (on 500), 200,000 (on 1,000), 500,000 (on 1,000) and 1,000,000 (on 1,000) córdobas notes as inflation drastically reduced the córdoba's value.

Second córdoba 

The second córdoba was only issued in banknote form. Notes (dated 1985) were issued in 1988 in denominations of 10, 20, 50, 100, 500 and 1000 córdobas together with undated 5000 córdobas. In 1989, notes for 10,000, 20,000, 50,000 and 100,000 córdobas were introduced, followed the next year by 200,000, 500,000, 1 million, 5 million and 10 million córdobas notes.

Third córdoba (córdoba oro) 
In 1991, notes were introduced for 1, 5, 10 and 25 centavos, 1, 5, 10, 20, 50 and 100 córdobas. The notes below 1 córdoba were replaced by coins in 1994, with 5 córdobas notes also being replaced in 1997. 500 córdobas notes were introduced in 2002.

Famous people from Nicaragua's history are depicted on the obverses of the current banknotes.  The reverses depict landmarks or natural habitats in the country.

2009 series 

On May 15, 2009, polymer ten and twenty córdoba notes were issued to circulate alongside their paper counterparts. A new polymer two hundred and  a paper one hundred córdoba banknote was first issued on June 1, 2009. A new polymer 50 córdoba was issued on December 3, 2009. The new designed paper 500 córdoba banknote was introduced on January 12, 2010. A commemorative design of the 50 córdobas was introduced on September 15, 2010, to commemorate the Banco Central de Nicaragua's 50th anniversary of its establishment. In 2012, the Banco Central de Nicaragua (Central Bank of Nicaragua) began issuing a new series of córdoba banknotes with revised security features, beginning with the 10, 20 and 200 córdoba polymer banknotes, which is similar to their first issue, but the notable change is the embossed "10", "20", and "200" on the see-through window now being of an opaque white.

The 100 córdoba banknote was also revised. The notable differences from the first issue is that the note was issued on the 100th anniversary of the córdoba currency. Also notable is the wider security thread, a revised registration device, a repositioned serial number, subtle underprint design changes and the commemorative text "1912-2012 Centenario del Cordoba" in pearlescent ink at the left front of the note. The 500 córdoba banknote was also revised. The most notable change for the note is the bank logo patch, now a holographic patch instead of an optically variable device and a wider security thread.

2015 and 2017 series 
On 26 October 2015, the Banco Central de Nicaragua introduced a new family of banknotes in denominations of 10, 20, 50, 100, 200 and 500 Córdobas. The five lower denominations are printed in polymer, while the 500 Córdobas note is printed on cotton paper substrate. On 1 December 2016, the Banco Central de Nicaragua introduced a 1,000 Córdobas banknote to ease high-value transactions. A commemorative design was issued on 1 December 2016 to commemorate the 100th anniversary of the death of poet Rubén Darío and a regular issue was issued on 2 January 2017.

In July 2019, the 500 and 1000 Córdoba banknotes were reissued in polymer, to circulate in parallel with existing issues.

Exchange rate

Historical exchange rates 
  =
 32.949 (XE) (July 2019)
 25.005 córdobas (August 2013)(XE)
 20.865 (Yahoo) or 20.8623 (XE) or 20.5250 (Oanda) (January 10, 2010)
 20.425 (Yahoo) or 20.4263 (XE) or 20.222 (Oanda) or 20.4268 (Central Bank of Nicaragua) córdobas (August 4, 2009)
 18.032 (Yahoo) or 19.874 (XE) or 20.113 (Oanda) córdobas (January 3, 2009)
 18.032 córdobas (June 19, 2008)
 18.032 córdobas (April 24, 2007)
 17.066 córdobas (June 5, 2006)
 17.1754 córdobas (January 13, 2006)
 16.300 córdobas (April 2005)
 15.5515 córdobas (December 2003)
  =
 37.084 (XE) (July 2019)
 36.9441 (XE) (October 23, 2018)
 30.0562 (Yahoo) or 30.0772 (XE) or 29.5661 (Oanda) (January 10, 2010)
 29.3674 (Yahoo) or 29.3721 (XE) or 28.93586 (Oanda) córdobas (August 4, 2009)
 25.1033 (Yahoo) or 27.532 (XE) or 28.008 (Oanda) córdobas (January 3, 2009)
 29.8987 córdobas (June 19, 2008)
 24.583 córdobas (April 24, 2007)
 22.1168 córdobas (June 5, 2006)
 19.910 córdobas (January 2006)
 21.361 córdobas (April 2005)
 19.6462 córdobas (December 2003)

See also 
 Economy of Nicaragua

References

Sources 

 
 and in the reference of tomorrow die

External links 
 Article on Currency – Córdoba
 Pictures of Nicaraguan banknotes and coins
 Banco Central de Nicaragua: Billetes y Monedas
 The banknotes of Nicaragua 

Currencies of Nicaragua
Currencies introduced in 1912
Currency symbols